This is a list of structures, sites, districts, and objects on the National Register of Historic Places in North Carolina:

Current listings by county

The following are approximate tallies of current listings by county. These counts are based on entries in the National Register Information Database as of April 24, 2008 and new weekly listings posted since then on the National Register of Historic Places web site. There are frequent additions to the listings and occasional delistings and the counts here are approximate and not official. The counts in this table exclude boundary increase and decrease listings which modify the area covered by an existing property or district and which carry a separate National Register reference number.

See also

List of National Historic Landmarks in North Carolina
List of bridges on the National Register of Historic Places in North Carolina

References

 NC Listings in the National Register of Historical Places

North Carolina